Nilay Aydogan (10 January 1992 – 12 February 2023) was a Turkish basketball player who played for the Turkey national team.

Aydogan died in Malatya as a result of the 2023 Turkey–Syria earthquake. She was 31.

References 

1992 births
2023 deaths
People from Malatya
Turkish women's basketball players
Victims of the 2023 Turkey–Syria earthquakes